Hypoptopoma thoracatum is a species of catfish in the family Loricariidae. It is native to South America, where it is known from the Amazon River basin. The species feeds on algae and reaches 8 cm (3.1 inches) in total length.

References 

Hypoptopomatini
Fish described in 1868